Imboden is an unincorporated community and coal town in Wise County, Virginia, United States.  The town exists between Appalachia and Keokee, Virginia on State Route 606.  It was named after Confederate General John Daniel Imboden.

References

Unincorporated communities in Wise County, Virginia
Coal towns in Virginia
Unincorporated communities in Virginia